Boxy SVG is a vector graphics editor for creating illustrations, as well as logos, icons, and other elements of graphic design. It is primarily focused on editing drawings in the SVG file format. The program is available as both a web app and a desktop application for Windows, macOS, ChromeOS, and Linux-based operating systems.

History

Boxy SVG was originally designed for macOS and written in both Objective-C and CoffeeScript. The first version was published on 2013-03-15 on the Mac App Store.

The second version, released on 2014-08-01, was a complete rewrite in JavaScript and Electron to make the application work as both a web app in a browser and a regular desktop application.

The third major release (2017-06-06) introduced a new user interface based on Xel, an HTML5 widget toolkit.

Afterwards, the developers switched to a shorter release cycle, with new versions rolled out every 1 or 2 months.

Platforms and requirements

Boxy SVG is available on multiple platforms.

Devices support

Boxy SVG is compatible with Apple desktop computers and laptops, touchscreen-based devices such as Google Pixelbook and Microsoft Surface.

The program is partially compatible with mobile devices running Android. The device must be able to run the latest stable version of Google Chrome, only saving files to the cloud storage is available. It is not compatible with Apple mobile devices like iPad because of the dependency on the Chromium engine.

The program also has basic support for graphics tablets such as those manufactured by Wacom.

Compatibility

The program uses SVG and SVGZ (zlib compressed version) as its native file formats. Some elements are in program's own namespace to either extend the feature set beyond what's available in the W3C SVG specification or provide a convenience layer for low-level details. Boxy SVG can also open SVG files authored with Inkscape and Adobe Illustrator, all software-specific elements and attributes will be dropped.

The application is based on the Electron framework and thus supports the same subset of the SVG format as Chromium-based web browsers such as Google Chrome, Microsoft Edge, and Opera. A major exception is the lack of support for animation.

Boxy SVG reads and writes PNG, JPEG, WebP, GIF, and PDF files, and reads Adobe Illustrator documents saved with the PDF compatibility mode on. Additionally, it can export HTML files.

Features

 Markup inspection: The XML code of the SVG document can be viewed and edited directly in the Elements panel.
Objects manipulation: General transformations such as moving, rotating, scaling, and skewing can be performed right on the canvas. Gradient and pattern fills can be customized using on-canvas handles.
Shapes: In addition to tools for drawing basic geometric shapes, such as rectangles and ellipses, the program features tools for drawing procedural shapes like cogwheels and crosses. This is done by using a custom namespace to extend the SVG specification. All shapes can be edited directly on the canvas. Additionally, numeric control over size, position, and other aspects of objects is available in the Geometry panel.
 Path drawing tools: The program has dedicated tools for drawing quadratic (2nd order) and cubic (3rd order) splines, as well as an Arc tool to draw consecutive arcs in a single Bézier curve.
 Reusable items: Boxy SVG can save colors, gradients, and patterns in the <defs> section of the SVG document so that multiple objects would be able to use the same fill definition and automatically update their look once that definition changes. The same principle applies to more elements like filters, markers, and fonts.
 Filters: The program has full support for SVG filter effects. It ships with a number of predefined filters such as Drop Shadow or Hue Rotation. New filters can be created with a graph-based filter designer.
 Bitmap tracing: Boxy SVG provides a Vectorize generator to trace bitmaps into Bézier curves with color fills depending on user-defined color quantization settings.
 Asset libraries: The program allows using fonts from Google Fonts, clip art and photos from Pixabay, and color swatches from the online service called Color Hunt.

Licensing

Boxy SVG is proprietary software. The web version is available under the subscription model with an option for team licensing. Desktop apps for Windows, macOS, and ChromeOS are distributed under a perpetual license. The version for Linux is free and has all features of its macOS and Windows counterparts.

See also

 Comparison of vector graphics editors
 Scalable Vector Graphics

References

External links
 Official website
 Official video tutorials

MacOS graphics software
Windows graphics-related software
Vector graphics editors
Vector graphics editors for Linux